Amod Prasad Upadhyay (born March 29, 1936) is a Nepalese social worker and politician.

Early life 
Upadhyay was born in Biratnagar to Janak Prasad Upadhyay and Chandrakumari Upadhyay.  He studied at Adarsha Vidyala in Biratnagar and completed his higher secondary education from Benaras, India. He holds a Bachelor of Arts in Political Science from Banaras Hindu University.

Political career 
Upadhyay joined politics in 1956 as a Nepali Congress activist.  An active member of the outlawed political opposition from 1960 to 1990, he  was arrested and imprisoned several times by the Panchayat regime for his pro-democracy activities. He spent a total of 16 months under arrest.

He participated in the 1990 People's Movement and served in the Rashtriya Sabha from 1991 to 1995 as a nominated member. He contested and won the 1999 by-elections for the Pratinidhi Sabha from the Morang-1 seat vacated by Girija Prasad Koirala. Upadhyay was Nepal's Minister for Education and Sports from March 2000 to May 2002 in the cabinets of Girija Prasad Koirala and Sher Bahadur Deuba.

Upadhyay protested the royal takeover of Feb 1, 2005 and was held in detention for several weeks by the government of King Gyanendra citing the Public Security Act (PSA). Following the 2006 democracy movement and the reinstatement of the Pratinidhi Sabha, he served as the Chief Whip of the Nepali Congress Parliamentary Party in the reinstated house and the interim-parliament.  In May 2008, he was elected to the Constituent Assembly of Nepal from Morang-1 and was a member of the Judicial System and Security Special committees.

The party's general convention in 2010 elected Upadhyay  to the party's Central Working Committee (CWC)  from Koshi Zone. He was picked by the CWC to head the Disciplinary Committee of the party on August 15, 2012.

Upadhyay was the Nepali Congress candidate for the 2013 constituent assembly elections from the Morang-1 constituency  losing to Rishikesh Pokhrel of the Communist Party of Nepal (UML).

Electoral history
1999 Pratinidhi Sabha Elections Morang-1 

2008 Constituent Assembly Election Morang-1 

Upadhyay was the only Nepali Congress candidate elected from the nine seats contested by the party in Morang district in this election.

Total Voters: 73,187 Votes Cast: 49,172 (67.19%) Valid Votes: 45,697

2013 Constituent Assembly Election Morang-1 

Total Voters: 54,722 Votes Cast:44,191 (80.76%)  Valid Votes: 40,975

References

Living people
1936 births
People from Biratnagar
People educated at Adarsha High School
Nepalese Hindus
Banaras Hindu University alumni
Nepalese activists
Koirala family
Nepali Congress politicians from Koshi Province
Government ministers of Nepal
Nepal MPs 1999–2002
Members of the National Assembly (Nepal)
Members of the 1st Nepalese Constituent Assembly